Seasick is the debut studio album by the American indie rock band Imperial Teen, released on May 7, 1996 by Slash Records. The album received generally positive reviews from critics.

Recording and release
Seasick was recorded in one week after the band had been together for six months. It was released on May 7, 1996 by Slash Records.

Reception

Writing for Spin, Barry Walters praised the songwriting, stating that the "hooks are immediate, nearly non-stop, and the happy/sad lyrics draw you in with abstract intimacy". The album was ranked number 24 in The Village Voices 1996 Pazz & Jop critics' poll. In a retrospective review, AllMusic reviewer Ned Raggett felt that Seasick was "in many ways the lost Breeders album after Last Splash -- brash, sharp-edged, taking no crap, and having good fun while doing so."

Track listing
"Imperial Teen" – 4:56
"Water Boy" – 1:37
"Butch" – 4:28
"Pig Latin" – 3:04
"Blaming the Baby" – 2:15
"You're One" – 3:23
"Balloon" – 3:46
"Tippy Tap" – 4:14
"Copafeelia" – 4:33
"Luxury" – 4:23
"Eternity" – 3:54

References

External links

1996 debut albums
Imperial Teen albums
Slash Records albums